The 2004–06 European Nations Cup doubled up as an element of qualification for the Rugby World Cup 2007. Ukraine replaced Spain as Champions of Division 2A. Romania and Georgia finished level on points, but Romania won the title on points difference; reigning champions Portugal finished in third place.

Table

Results

2004–05

2005–06

2004-06
2004–05 in European rugby union
2005–06 in European rugby union
2004 in Russian rugby union
2005 in Russian rugby union
2006 in Russian rugby union
2004–05 in Romanian rugby union
2005–06 in Romanian rugby union